Barun Mazumder (9 September 1942 – 14 October 2019) was an Indian journalist, news reader, writer and teacher. He received Padma Shri from the Government of India for his contribution in literature and education.

Biography
Mazumder was born 9 September 1942. He received post graduate degree in Journalism from Kolkata University in 1965.

Mazumder worked in Dainik Basumati for ten years. He was a war correspondent in Bangladesh during the Bangladesh Liberation War. Besides, he also worked in Akashbani Kolkata as a journalist and news reader.

Mazumder was also involved in teaching and writing. He wrote more than fifty books. He was a teacher of Baje Shibpur B. K. Paul's Institution. Besides, he was a lecturer of Indira Gandhi National Open University and Midnapore College. He was awarded Padma Shri in 2011 for his contribution in literature and education.

Mazumder died on 14 October 2019.

References

1942 births
2019 deaths
University of Calcutta alumni
Indian journalists
Indian radio personalities
Indian writers
Academic staff of Indira Gandhi National Open University
Bengali writers
Recipients of the Padma Shri in literature & education